Dörtyol Belediyespor is a women's football club located in Dörtyol near Hatay, southern Turkey. The team competes in Turkish Women's Third Football League.

Statistics

Notes:
1) Three penalty points  were deducted by the Turkish Football Federation

References

External links 
Dörtyol Belediyespor on TFF.org

Football clubs in Hatay
Women's football clubs in Turkey
Dörtyol District